Paradox is the pseudonym of Dev Pandya, a British producer.

Career
Pandya was born in 1970s in England. In recent years he has championed a new subgenre of drum and bass known as drumfunk, which focuses on either finding obscure breakbeats or re-sampling much used drum-and-bass breakbeats from their original source and transforming them into constantly shifting drum patterns, noticeably different from traditional drum and bass.

He also records a duo with producer Nucleus. He also has regularly collaborated with artist Seba.

He also records under the pseudonym Alaska. From 1994 to 2020(new release under the name Alaska to come out at the end of 2020), Pandya went by the alias Brown in collaboration with Rhymeside (Scott Williams), DJ Trax (David Davies) and Dangerman, which is another alias from Davies. Under the artist name of DMR Pandya released tracks as Paradox & DMR on the label Certificate 18 in 1998.

Pandya runs four record labels: Paradox Music, Esoteric, Outsider, and Arctic Music. He also ran the labels Mob Handed, Stronghold Records and Offset Recordings together with Davies from 1994 to 1997. Those labels are inactive, which means that there are no more records released on them.

Paradox released his first full-length album Musician as Outsider in 2000 on Reinforced Records as single artist. Both the CD and LP releases have ten tracks on them, but the CD version had a bonus CD with live PA-footage from Paradox's 2000 tour. There was a special Japan version of the CD, released by Sony Japan, which featured changed patterns, different run times and the bonus-track "The Unspoken Divide".

In 2002 the second Paradox album, again on Reinforced came out, called What You Don't Know. The LP version features ten tracks and the double CD release has 12 tracks on CD 1 and video footage from the 2002 live tour on CDVD (CD 2).

In 2004, the album The Esoteric Funk by Nucleus & Paradox was again released on Reinforced Records. Nucleus' real name is Dave Sims. Sims and Pandya had released a CD album before in 1997 which is called Noise & Paradox Transmograpfication. At that time Simms went by the name "Noise".

Paradox released the first CD Seba & Paradox Beats Me on his label Paradox Music in 2006 featuring tracks from Seba, Paradox and Seba & Paradox collaborations.

In 2007, Paradox released the first CD on his label Outsider called Paradox Presents: The Age of Outsiders featuring selected tracks from all releases on Outsider. CD 1 was mixed by Nucleus and CD 2 was mixed by DJ Trax.

July 2006 saw the 100th release of Paradox. On this occasion the 12" release was a special red vinyl featuring remixes of the Paradox-tracks "The Unspoken Divide" and "Give the Drummer Some".

In collaboration with Bill Laswell and Herbie Hancock, Paradox is featured on the album Method of Defiance Inamorata on the label Ohm Resistance with two tracks. While the track "Panepha" has Paradox programmed the drums, Hancock plays the keyboard and Laswell the bass. The track "Humanoid" has Paradox, again drum programmer, Toshinori Kondo (is an avant-garde jazz and jazz fusion trumpeter) on the trumpet, Bernie Worrell (Parliament Funkadelic) on the keyboards and Laswell as usual on the bass. The album was released in 2007.

Altogether Pandya released circa 320 tracks on 42 labels from 1993 to 2008 using different aliases and in collaboration with many artists including Nucleus/Noise, Volcov, Alaska/DMR, Seba, DJ Trax, Marc De Clive-Lowe, and Subject 13.

He also did remixes not only of his own tracks but from artists including Deep Blue, Resound, Shobha Gurtu, LTJ Bukem, Materia, Ultra-Violet, James Hardway, Kirsty Hawkshaw, Ill Logic & Raf, Duo Infernale, DJ Trax, NXS, Boom Boom Satellites, and Justice.

See also

 List of British people
 List of jungle and drum and bass artists
 List of record producers

References

External links
 paradoxmusic.com, Paradox's official website
 
 

1972 births
English drum and bass musicians
English record producers
Living people
Place of birth missing (living people)
Reinforced Records artists